Robert James Gordon is an American economist. He is the Stanley G. Harris Professor of the Social Sciences at Northwestern University. Gordon is one of the world’s leading experts on inflation, unemployment, and long-term economic growth. His recent work asking whether U.S. economic growth is “almost over” has been widely cited, and in 2016 he was named as one of Bloomberg’s top 50 most influential people in the world.

Education
Gordon graduated magna cum laude with a B.A. from Harvard University in 1962.  He then attended Oxford University as a Marshall Scholar and received his B.A. in 1964.  He received his Ph.D. from MIT in 1967 with a dissertation titled Problems in the Measurement of Real Investment in the U.S. Private Economy.

Career and contributions
From 1995 to 1997, he served on the Boskin Commission to assess the accuracy of the United States Consumer Price Index (CPI), having written the definitive criticism of CPI inflation overstatement in 1990.  He was also a member of the Business Cycle Dating Committee of the NBER, which determines when recessions start and end, for more than three decades.

Robert J. Gordon's popular text Macroeconomics was the first to incorporate the rational expectations hypothesis into the analysis of the Phillips curve.  Soon all subsequent macro textbooks were expounding the "Expectations Augmented Phillips Curve."  In addition, Gordon has written for economic journals, outlining the relation of the productivity growth of modern-day inventions to the great inventions of the late 19th century. He focuses on the impact of computers in the post-1995 economy on the durable manufacturing sector. Furthermore, he emphasises the marginal productivity of computing technology affects standard of living in a much more contained fashion than the earlier great American inventions. Contrary to conventional wisdom, he downplays the role of computer technology in the economic growth of the latter 20th century in accounting for business cycle and trends. This concept may help explain the productivity paradox – why economic productivity growth since 1970 has been significantly lower than in the preceding century, when a different set of technological and medical advancements drove a much higher rate of economic productivity growth.

His 2016 book The Rise and Fall of American Growth was published by the Princeton University Press. The book discusses the immense economic growth that occurred in the century following the American Civil War as well as why such growth cannot be repeated.

Family

Gordon is a member of a family of economists.  Both his parents Robert Aaron and Margaret earned distinction independently, each  contributing to economic knowledge with a view to real practical benefit for society, as did his brother David, himself more of a radical. For example, his father is the namesake of the "Gordon Report" which proposed reforms for the computation of the unemployment rate by the US Department of Labor Bureau of Labor Statistics. He currently resides in Evanston, Illinois with his wife Julie.

Selected works
The Rise and Fall of American Growth: The U.S. Standard of Living Since the Civil War. Princeton University Press. 2016. .

References

External links

  Northwestern University: Robert J. Gordon
 Robert J. Gordon's economics papers at RePEc
 
 

1940 births
Living people
21st-century American economists
20th-century American economists
Fellows of the Econometric Society
Harvard University alumni
MIT School of Humanities, Arts, and Social Sciences alumni
New Keynesian economists
Northwestern University faculty
Fellows of the American Academy of Arts and Sciences
Distinguished Fellows of the American Economic Association
Journal of Political Economy editors
Fellows of the American Physical Society